Fania is a genus of moths in the family Cossidae erected by William Barnes and James Halliday McDunnough in 1911.

Species
Fania connecta (Barnes & McDunnough, 1916)
Fania nanus (Strecker, 1876)

References

Cossinae
Moth genera